The Landsat program is the longest-running enterprise for acquisition of satellite imagery of Earth. It is a joint NASA / USGS program. On 23 July 1972, the Earth Resources Technology Satellite was launched. This was eventually renamed to Landsat 1 in 1975. The most recent, Landsat 9, was launched on 27 September 2021.

The instruments on the Landsat satellites have acquired millions of images. The images, archived in the United States and at Landsat receiving stations around the world, are a unique resource for global change research and applications in agriculture, cartography, geology, forestry, regional planning, surveillance and education, and can be viewed through the U.S. Geological Survey (USGS) "EarthExplorer" website. Landsat images are usually divided into scenes for easy downloading. Each Landsat scene is about 115 miles long and 115 miles wide (or 100 nautical miles long and 100 nautical miles wide, or 185 kilometers long and 185 kilometers wide).

History 

In 1965, William T. Pecora, the then director of the United States Geological Survey, proposed the idea of a remote sensing satellite program to gather facts about the natural resources of our planet. Pecora stated that the program was “conceived in 1966 largely as a direct result of the demonstrated utility of the Mercury and Gemini orbital photography to Earth resource studies.” While weather satellites had been monitoring Earth’s atmosphere since 1960 and were largely considered useful, there was no appreciation of terrain data from space until the mid-1960s. So, when Landsat 1 was proposed, it met with intense opposition from the Bureau of Budget and those who argued high-altitude aircraft would be the fiscally responsible choice for Earth remote sensing. Concurrently, the Department of Defense feared that a civilian program such as Landsat would compromise the secrecy of their reconnaissance missions. Additionally, there were also geopolitical concerns about photographing foreign countries without permission. In 1965, NASA began methodical investigations of Earth remote sensing using instruments mounted on planes. In 1966, the USGS convinced the Secretary of the Interior, Stewart Udall, to announce that the Department of the Interior (DOI) was going to proceed with its own Earth-observing satellite program. This savvy political stunt coerced NASA to expedite the building of Landsat. But budgetary constraints and sensor disagreements between application agencies (notably the Department of Agriculture and DOI) again stymied the satellite construction process. Finally, by 1970 NASA had a green light to build a satellite. Remarkably, within only two years, Landsat 1 was launched, heralding a new age of remote sensing of land from space.

The Hughes Aircraft Company from Santa Barbara Research Center initiated, designed, and fabricated the first three Multispectral Scanners (MSS) in 1969. The first MSS prototype, designed by Virginia Norwood, was completed within nine months, in the fall of 1970. It was tested by scanning Half Dome at Yosemite National Park. For this design work Norwood is called "The Mother of Landsat."

Working at NASA's Goddard Space Flight Center, Valerie L. Thomas managed the development of early Landsat image processing software systems and became the resident expert on the Computer Compatible Tapes, or CCTs, that were used to store early Landsat imagery. Thomas was one of the image processing specialists who facilitated the ambitious Large Area Crop Inventory Experiment, known as LACIE — a project that showed for the first time that global crop monitoring could be done with Landsat satellite imagery.

The program was initially called the Earth Resources Technology Satellites Program, which was used from 1966 to 1975. In 1975, the name was changed to Landsat. In 1979, President of the United States Jimmy Carter's Presidential Directive 54 transferred Landsat operations from NASA to National Oceanic and Atmospheric Administration (NOAA), recommended development of a long term operational system with four additional satellites beyond Landsat 3, and recommended transition to private sector operation of Landsat. This occurred in 1985 when the Earth Observation Satellite Company (EOSAT), a partnership of Hughes Aircraft Company and RCA, was selected by NOAA to operate the Landsat system with a ten-year contract. EOSAT operated Landsat 4 and Landsat 5, had exclusive rights to market Landsat data, and was to build Landsats 6 and 7.

In 1989, this transition had not been fully completed when NOAA's funding for the Landsat program was due to run out (NOAA had not requested any funding, and U.S. Congress had appropriated only six months of funding for the fiscal year) and NOAA directed that Landsat 4 and Landsat 5 be shut down.

The head of the newly formed National Space Council, Vice President Dan Quayle, noted the situation and arranged emergency funding that allowed the program to continue with the data archives intact.

Again in 1990 and 1991, Congress provided only half of the year's funding to NOAA, requesting that agencies that used Landsat data provide the funding for the other six months of the upcoming year.

In 1992, various efforts were made to procure funding for follow on Landsats and continued operations, but by the end of the year EOSAT ceased processing Landsat data. Landsat 6 was finally launched on 5 October 1993, but was lost in a launch failure. Processing of Landsat 4 and 5 data was resumed by EOSAT in 1994. NASA finally launched Landsat 7 on 15 April 1999.

The value of the Landsat program was recognized by Congress in October 1992 when it passed the Land Remote Sensing Policy Act (Public Law 102-555) authorizing the procurement of Landsat 7 and assuring the continued availability of Landsat digital data and images, at the lowest possible cost, to traditional and new users of the data.

Satellite chronology 

Timeline

Spatial and spectral resolution 
Landsat 1 through 5 carried the Landsat Multispectral Scanner (MSS). Landsat 4 and 5 carried both the MSS and Thematic Mapper (TM) instruments. Landsat 7 uses the Enhanced Thematic Mapper Plus (ETM+) scanner. Landsat 8 uses two instruments, the Operational Land Imager (OLI) for optical bands and the Thermal Infrared Sensor (TIRS) for thermal bands. The band designations, bandpasses, and pixel sizes for the Landsat instruments are:

* Original MSS pixel size was 79 x 57 meters; production systems now resample the data to 60 meters.

* TM Band 6 was acquired at 120-meter resolution, but products are resampled to 30-meter pixels.

* ETM+ Band 6 is acquired at 60-meter resolution, but products are resampled to 30-meter pixels.

* TIRS bands are acquired at 100 meter resolution, but are resampled to 30 meter in delivered data product.

An advantage of Landsat imagery, and remote sensing in general, is that it provides data at a synoptic global level that is impossible to replicate with in situ measurements. However, there are tradeoffs between the local detail of the measurements (radiometric resolution, number of spectral bands) and the spatial scale of the area being measured. Landsat imagery is coarse in spatial resolution compared to using other remote sensing methods, such as imagery from airplanes. Compared to other satellites, Landsat’s spatial resolution is relatively high, yet revisit time is relatively less frequent.

MultiSpectral Scanner (MSS) sensor design 

The Multispectral Scanner (MSS) onboard Landsat missions 1 through 5 was originally built with an engineering solution that allowed the United States to develop Landsat-1 at least five years ahead of the French SPOT. The original MSS had a  fused silica dinner-plate mirror epoxy bonded to three invar tangent bars mounted to base of a nickel/gold brazed Invar frame in a Serrurier truss that was arranged with four "Hobbs-Links" (conceived by Dr. Gregg Hobbs), crossing at mid-truss. This construct ensured the secondary mirror would simply oscillate about the primary optic axis to maintain focus despite vibration inherent from the  beryllium scan mirror. In contrast, SPOT first used charge-coupled device (CCD) arrays to stare without need for a scanner. However, LANDSAT data prices climbed from US$250 per computer compatible data tape and US$10 for black-and-white print to US$4,400 for data tape and US$2,700 for black-and-white print by 1984, making SPOT data a much more affordable option for satellite imaging data. This was a direct result of the commercialization efforts begun under the Carter administration, though finally completed under the Reagan administration.

The MSS Focal Plane Array consisted of 24 square optical fibers extruded down to  square fiber tips in a 4 x 6 array to be scanned across the Nimbus spacecraft path in a ±6° scan as the satellite was in a 90 minute polar orbit. This main plate was assembled on a frame, then attached to the silver-loaded magnesium housing with helicoil fasteners.

Key to the success of the multi spectral scanner was the scan monitor mounted on the underbelly of the magnesium housing. It consisted of a diode light source and a sensor mounted at the ends of four flat mirrors that were tilted so that it took 14 bounces for a beam to reflect the length of the three mirrors from source to sender. The beam struck the beryllium scan mirror eight times as it reflected eight times off the flat mirrors. The beam only sensed three positions, being both ends of scan and the mid scan, but by interpolating between these positions that was all that was required to determine where the multi spectral scanner was pointed. Using the scan monitor information, the scanning data could be calibrated to display correctly on a map.

Uses of Landsat imagery 

Landsat data provides information that allows scientists to predict the distribution of species, as well as detecting both naturally occurring and human-generated changes over a greater scale than traditional data from field work. The different spectral bands used on satellites in the Landsat program provide many applications, ranging from ecology to geopolitical matters. Land cover determination is a common use of Landsat imagery around the world.

Landsat imagery provides one of the longest uninterrupted time series available from any single remote sensing program, spanning from 1972 to present. Looking to the future, the successful launch of Landsat-9 in 2021 shows that this time series will be continued forward.

In 2015, the Landsat Advisory Group of the National Geospatial Advisory Committee reported that the top 16 applications of Landsat imagery produced savings of approximately 350 million to over 436 million dollars each year for federal and state governments, NGO’s, and the private sector. That estimate did not include further savings from other uses beyond the top sixteen categories. The top 16 categories for Landsat imagery use, listed in order of estimated annual savings for users, are: 
 U.S. Department of Agriculture risk management
 U.S. Government mapping
 Agricultural water use monitoring
 Global security monitoring
 Support for fire management
 Detection of forest fragmentation
 Detection of forest change
 World agriculture supply and demand estimates
 Vineyard management and water conservation
 Flood mitigation mapping
 Agricultural commodities mapping
 Waterfowl habitat mapping and monitoring
 Coastal change analysis
 Forest health monitoring
 National Geospatial-Intelligence Agency global shoreline mapping
 Wildfire risk assessment 

Further uses of Landsat imagery include, but are not limited to: fisheries, forestry, shrinking inland water bodies, fire damage, glacier retreat, urban development, and discovery of new species. A few specific examples are explained below.

Natural resources management

Fisheries 
In 1975, one potential application for the new satellite-generated imagery was to find high yield fishery areas. Through the Landsat Menhaden and Thread Investigation, some satellite data of the eastern portion of the Mississippi sound and another area off the coast of the Louisiana coast data was run through classification algorithms to rate the areas as high and low probability fishing zones, these algorithms yielded a classification that was proven with in situ measurements – to be over 80% accurate and found that water color, as seen from space, and turbidity significantly correlate with the distribution of menhaden – while surface temperature and salinity do not appear to be significant factors. Water color – measured with the multispectral scanners four spectral bands, was used to infer Chlorophyll, turbidity, and possibly fish distribution.

Forestry 
An ecological study used 16 ortho-rectified Landsat images to generate a land cover map of Mozambique's mangrove forest. The main objective was to measure the mangrove cover and above ground biomass on this zone that until now could only be estimated, the cover was found with 93% accuracy to be 2909 square kilometers (27% lower than previous estimates). Additionally, the study helped confirm that geological setting has a greater influence on biomass distribution than latitude alone - the mangrove area is spread across 16° of latitude but it the biomass volume of it was affected more strongly by geographic conditions.

Climate change and environmental disasters

Shrinking of the Aral Sea 
The shrinking of the Aral Sea has been described as "One of the planet's worst environmental disasters". Landsat imagery has been used as a record to quantify the amount of water loss and the changes to the shoreline. Satellite visual images have a greater impact on people than just words, and this shows the importance of Landsat imagery and satellite images in general.

Fires in Yellowstone National Park 
The Yellowstone fires of 1988 were the worst in the recorded history of the national park. They lasted from 14 June to 11 September 1988, when rain and snow helped halt the spread of the fires. The area affected by the fire was estimated to be 3,213 square kilometers – 36% of the park. Landsat imagery was used for the area estimation, and it also helped determine the reasons why the fire spread so quickly. Historic drought and a significant number of lightning strikes were some of the factors that created conditions for the massive fire, but anthropogenic actions amplified the disaster. On images generated previous to the fire, there is an evident difference between lands that display preservation practices and the lands that display clear cut activities for timber production. These two type of lands reacted differently to the stress of fires, and it is believed that that was an important factor on the behavior of the wildfire. Landsat imagery, and satellite imagery in general, have contributed to understanding fire science; fire danger, wildfire behavior and the effects of wildfire on certain areas. It has helped understanding of how different features and vegetation fuel fires, change temperature, and affect the spreading speed.

Glacier retreat 
The serial nature of Landsat missions and the fact that is the longest-running satellite program gives it a unique perspective to generate information of Earth. Glacier retreat in a big scale can be traced back to previous Landsat missions, and this information can be used to generate climate change knowledge. The Columbia glacier retreat for example, can be observed in false-composite images since Landsat 4 in 1986.

Urban development
Landsat imagery gives a time-lapse like series of images of development. Human development specifically, can be measured by the size a city grows over time. Further than just population estimates and energy consumption, Landsat imagery gives an insight of the type of urban development, and study aspects of social and political change through visible change. In Beijing for example, a series of ring roads started to develop in 1980s following the economic reform of 1970, and the change in development rate and construction rate was accelerated in these time periods.

Ecology

Discovery of new species 
In 2005, Landsat imagery assisted in the discovery of new species. Conservation scientist Julian Bayliss wanted to find areas that could potentially become conservation forests using Landsat generated satellite images. Bayliss saw a patch in Mozambique that until then had no detailed information. On a reconnaissance trip, he found great diversity of wildlife as well as three new species of butterflies and a new snake species. Following his discovery, he continued to study this forest and was able to map and determine the forest extent.

Recent and future Landsat satellites 

Landsat 8 launched on 11 February 2013. It was launched on an Atlas V 401 from Vandenberg Air Force Base by the Launch Services Program. It will continue to obtain valuable data and imagery to be used in agriculture, education, business, science, and government. The new satellite was assembled in Arizona by Orbital Sciences Corporation.

Landsat 9 launched on September 27, 2021. During FY2014 financial planning "appropriators chided NASA for unrealistic expectations that a Landsat 9 would cost US$1 billion, and capped spending at US$650 million" according to a report by the Congressional Research Service. United States Senate appropriators advised NASA to plan for a launch no later than 2020. In April 2015, NASA and the USGS announced that work on Landsat 9 had commenced, with funding allocated for the satellite in the president's FY2016 budget, for a planned launch in 2023. Funding for the development of a low-cost thermal infrared (TIR) free-flying satellite for launch in 2019 was also proposed, to ensure data continuity by flying in formation with Landsat 8.

In the future, there may also be more collaboration between Landsat satellites and other satellites with similar spatial and spectral resolution, such as the ESA’s Sentinel-2 constellation.

Landsat NeXt is planned to be launched in 2029. NeXt will measure 25 spectral bands; current Landsat's 8 and 9 can measure only 11.

Gallery

See also 

 Earth observation satellite
 Geographic information system
 Orthophoto, corrected for uniform scale like a map
 Remote sensing

References

External links 

 Landsat USGS homepage
 Landsat NASA homepage
 
 Landsat imagery from GLOVIS and Global Land Cover Facility
 Landsat mosaic imagery from the WELD project.

 
Articles containing video clips
Earth observation satellites of the United States
National Oceanic and Atmospheric Administration
NASA programs
United States Geological Survey
Satellite imagery
1966 introductions